Zehuki (also Romanized as Zehūkī) is a village in Band-e Zarak Rural District, in the Central District of Minab County, Hormozgan Province, Iran. At the 2006 census, its population was 3,349, in 664 families.

References 

Populated places in Minab County